Victor "Kucku" Olsson (21 February 1895 – 24 January 1982) was a Swedish football player, best known for representing Hammarby IF. A full international between 1920 and 1921, he won four caps for the Sweden national team.

Club career

Hammarby IF
In 1915, Hammarby IF established a football section after a merger with Klara SK, where 20-year old Olsson had started to play as a youngster. Olsson soon established himself as one of Hammarby's key players, together with defender Gösta Wihlborg and striker Gustav Björk. In 1920, Hammarby debuted in the Svenska Serien, by then the highest league in Swedish football. He played 15 competitive games throughout the season, as the club finished third in the table, three points behind winners Örgryte.

In 1922, Hammarby had an other strong showing where they went to the finals of Svenska Mästerskapet, losing 1–3 to GAIS, a game that Olsson missed due to sickness.

Hammarby IF was one of the founding members of Allsvenskan in 1924, a new league that was established to determine the Swedish Champions. By this time, 29-year old Olsson had lost his place as the starting goalkeeper, to Rickard Westling, and he only played four games throughout the season.

Olsson was the youth idol of Sven Bergqvist, that later would become a goalkeeper for both Hammarby and Sweden, who frequently acted as a ball boy during home games on Hammarby IP.

International career
Olsson was one of the first players from Hammarby IF to establish himself as a member of the Sweden national team. He won four caps for his country between 1920 and 1921.

Works cited

References

External links

1895 births
1982 deaths
Swedish footballers
Association football goalkeepers
Allsvenskan players
Hammarby Fotboll players
Sweden international footballers
Footballers from Stockholm